The 2011 Latvian Higher League was the 20th season of top-tier football in Latvia. It began on 15 April 2011 and ended on 5 November 2011.

The competition was won by FK Ventspils, who thus qualified for the 2012–13 UEFA Champions League. Runners-up Liepājas Metalurgs and third-placed sides Daugava Daugavpils earned spots for the 2012–13 UEFA Europa League. On the bottom end of the table, JFK Olimps/RFS were relegated after losing their play-off series against Spartaks Jūrmala.

All nine clubs played every other club four times during the course of the season: twice at home and twice away. In addition, there will be no direct relegation to the Latvian First League this year.

Teams
Jaunība Rīga finished the previous year's competition in tenth place and were relegated to the Latvian First League. This ended a one-year stay in the top flight. Promoted to the Higher League from the First Division automatically were the previous season's First Division champions, Gulbene 2005, who are taking part in the top flight for the first time in their history in 2011.

FC Tranzit finished 9th in the 2010 Higher League competition and were supposed to compete in a promotion/relegation playoff against the runners-up of the First Division, FC Jūrmala. However, before this playoff took place, Tranzit informed the Latvian Football Federation that they were forfeiting their place in the Higher League altogether, ending a two-year stay in the top flight. Therefore, FC Jūrmala were promoted to the Higher League automatically. Like Gulbene, they are competing in the top flight for the first time in their history in 2011.

Finally, SK Blāzma decided to withdraw from the league during the off-season. This ended a three-year stay in the top flight. At a meeting on 28 January 2011, the LFF decided that they would not be replaced in this year's competition.

Team summaries

League table

Results

First half of season

Second half of season

Relegation play-offs
At the season's end, the 9th place club in the Latvian Higher League will face the runners-up of the Latvian First League in a two-legged playoff, with the winner being awarded a spot in the 2012 Higher League competition.

Top goalscorers
Source: LMT Virslīga 2011

Awards

Team of the Tournament

sportacentrs.com version:__Latvian Football Federation version:Individual nominationsPlayers selected by sportacentrs.com:Best foreign player:  Daniel Ola (Jūrmala)

Best young player (U-21):   Arevshat Khachatryan (Gulbene)

Best coach:  Tamaz Pertia (Daugava Daugavpils/ Olimps/RFS)

Surprise of the season:  Oļegs Laizāns (Ventspils)

Player of the season:  Jurģis Kalns (Liepājas Metalurgs)Players selected by LFF:Best goalkeeper:  Germans Māliņš (Skonto Riga)

Best defender:  Pāvels Mihadjuks (Liepājas Metalurgs)

Best midfielder:  Oļegs Laizāns (Ventspils)

Best forward:  Nathan Júnior (Skonto Riga)

Best coach:  Sergei Podpaly (Ventspils)

Top scorer:  Nathan Júnior (Skonto Riga) (22 goals)Best young player (U-21):  Valērijs Šabala (Skonto Riga)

Player of the season:  Oļegs Laizāns (Ventspils)

 Team awardsPlayers selected by LFF:''

Best match organization:Jelgava

Fair-play award:Gulbene

References

External links
 Latvian Football Federation 
 Latvian Football Federation news 

Latvian Higher League seasons
1
Latvia
Latvia